Matteson is one of two commuter rail stations along the Main Branch of the Metra Electric line which serve Matteson, Illinois.

Originally built in 1863, and rebuilt in 1912, it was the southernmost station to be built before the line was electrified in 1926. Matteson is built on elevated tracks near the embankment of a bridge over Front Street. This bridge also carries the Amtrak line that runs parallel to it, carrying the City of New Orleans, Illini, and Saluki trains. Parking is available on both sides of the tracks on the south side of Front Street and a parallel bicycle path. The west side parking lot is along Main Street between the Front Street and Main Street bridges, while the larger east side parking lot is within the Village of Matteson but is actually operated by the Village of Park Forest and located on the corner of North Street, Homan Avenue, and Front Street. A pedestrian tunnel which runs beneath the tracks, is also elevated and has staircases on each end connects the two parking lots.

No bus connections are available at this station, but the Old Plank Road Trail offers a human-powered right-of-way going east and west.

There is evidence of another island platform to the east of the current platform. This served the IC long-distance trains on a non-electrified double track line—the same tracks used by Amtrak today.

References

External links

Front Street entrance from Google Maps Street View

Metra stations in Illinois
Former Illinois Central Railroad stations
Former New York Central Railroad stations
Railway stations in Cook County, Illinois
Railway stations in Will County, Illinois
Railway stations in the United States opened in 1863